John Baird (February 11, 1859 – November 9, 1934), was a Republican politician from the State of Michigan from the 1890s through the 1920s, serving as Township Supervisor, State Representative, State Senator, Delegate to Michigan's 1907–1908 Constitutional Convention, and head of the Michigan Conservation Department (now Department of Natural Resources).

Early life

John Baird was born on February 11, 1859, in Quebec City, Province of Canada, (now part of Quebec). His parents later moved to Seaforth, Ontario, and stayed there until John's father died in 1874, and his mother took him and his siblings and moved to Zilwaukee, Michigan. After he became a U.S. citizen, John developed his interest in politics, and ran and was elected Zilwaukee Township Supervisor about 1890.

State Politician

In 1894, John Baird ran and was elected State Representative to the Michigan Legislature, and later elected State Senator. In 1906, Michigan voters approved calling a convention to write a new constitution for Michigan, and John Baird was elected a delegate in 1907. The new constitution that Johnny had a part in making was approved by the voters in November 1908 and took effect Jan, 1, 1909.

In 1921, Michigan's series of different conservation departments were consolidated into the Michigan Conservation Department, and Governor Alex Groesbeck appointed John Baird to be the first head of it, serving in that position until 1927.

Extraordinary Political Maneuvers

In 1912, when the Republican state nominating convention was to meet in Bay City to nominate a candidate for President, John Baird knew in advance there would be trouble between the delegates who wanted to nominate incumbent President William H. Taft and those who wanted Theodore Roosevelt. While communicating with an official over the phone about an issue, a switchboard operator left a phone line open, and Baird overheard a conversation between two men who were discussing the convention, and John Baird's prediction proved true when the convention turned into a brawl between Taft and Roosevelt delegates.

In 1924, during the Michigan Presidential Primary, John Baird had the name of a Hiram Johnson from Milwaukee placed on the ballot, which matched the name of Democratic Senator Hiram Johnson of California. John Baird, who believed presidential primaries were a waste of time and money, was trying to show how vulnerable the primary was to tampering, and the Hiram Johnson he put on the ballot turn out to have died months earlier.

Quote from Baird

One day, John Baird was pulling weeds from his garden, and his young grandson David asked him what he was doing. He replied, "I'm pulling out the Democrats."  His grandson said he thought they looked like weeds, in which John Baird said, "What's the difference? They both choke out anything that's good."

References
The Saginaw (Mich.) News, Nov. 10, 1934

1859 births
1934 deaths
People from Saginaw County, Michigan
Members of the Michigan House of Representatives
Michigan state senators
People from Huron County, Ontario